Menallen Township is the name of some places in the U.S. state of Pennsylvania:

Menallen Township, Adams County, Pennsylvania
Menallen Township, Fayette County, Pennsylvania

Pennsylvania township disambiguation pages